This page provides the summaries of the OFC Second Round matches for 2002 FIFA World Cup qualification.

Format
In this round the two winning teams from the First Round were drawn into 2 home-and-away ties.

The winners advanced to the CONMEBOL–OFC play-off.

Matches

 

Australia won 6–1 on aggregate and advanced to the CONMEBOL–OFC play-off.

2
2001
2001
2001 in Australian soccer
2001 in New Zealand association football